Heinrich Theodor Böll (21 December 1917 – 16 July 1985) was a German writer. Considered one of Germany's foremost post-World War II writers, Böll is a recipient of the Georg Büchner Prize (1967) and the Nobel Prize for Literature (1972).

Biography 
Böll was born in Cologne, Germany, to a Roman Catholic and pacifist family that later opposed the rise of Nazism. Böll refused to join the Hitler Youth during the 1930s. He was apprenticed to a bookseller before studying German studies and classics at the University of Cologne.

Conscripted into the Wehrmacht, he served in Poland, France, Romania, Hungary and the Soviet Union.

In 1942, Böll married Annemarie Cech, with whom he had three sons; she later collaborated with him on a number of different translations into German of English language literature.

During his war service, Böll was wounded four times and contracted typhoid. He was captured by US Army soldiers in April 1945 and sent to a prisoner-of-war camp.

After the war he returned to Cologne and began working in his family's cabinet shop and, for one year, worked in a municipal statistical bureau, an experience which he did not enjoy and which he left in order to take the risk of becoming a writer instead.

Böll became a full-time writer at the age of 30. His first novel, Der Zug war pünktlich (The Train Was on Time), was published in 1949. He was invited to the 1949 meeting of the Group 47 circle of German authors and his work was deemed to be the best presented in 1951.

Many other novels, short stories, radio plays and essay collections followed.

Awards, honours and appointments
Böll was extremely successful and was lauded on a number of occasions. In 1953 he was awarded the Culture Prize of German Industry, the Southern German Radio Prize and the German Critics' Prize. In 1954 he received the prize of the Tribune de Paris. In 1955 he was given the French prize for the best foreign novel. In 1958 he gained the Eduard von der Heydt prize of the city of Wuppertal and the prize of the Bayerische Akademie der Schönen Künste (Bavarian Academy of Fine Arts). In 1959 he was given the Great Art Prize of the State of North-Rhine-Westphalia, the Literature Prize of the city of Cologne, and was elected to the Academy of Science and the Arts in Mainz.

In 1960 he became a member of the Bavarian Academy of Fine Arts and gained the Charles Veillon Prize.

In 1967 he was given the Georg Büchner Prize.

In 1972 he received the Nobel Prize for Literature "for his writing which through its combination of a broad perspective on his time and a sensitive skill in characterization has contributed to a renewal of German literature".

He was given a number of honorary awards up to his death, such as the membership of the American Academy of Arts and Letters in 1974, and the Ossietzky Medal of 1974 (the latter for his defence of and contribution to global human rights).

Böll was President of PEN International, the worldwide association of writers, from 1971 to 1973.

Böll was elected to the American Philosophical Society in 1983 and the American Academy of Arts and Sciences in 1984.

Works
His work has been translated into more than 30 languages, and he remains one of Germany's most widely read authors. His best-known works are Billiards at Half-past Nine (1959), And Never Said a Word (1953), The Bread of Those Early Years (1955),  The Clown (1963), Group Portrait with Lady (1971), The Lost Honour of Katharina Blum (1974), and The Safety Net (1979).

Despite the variety of themes and content in his work, there are certain recurring patterns: many of his novels and stories describe intimate and personal life struggling to sustain itself against the wider background of war, terrorism, political divisions, and profound economic and social transition. In a number of his books there are protagonists who are stubborn and eccentric individualists opposed to the mechanisms of the state or of public institutions.

Böll was a devoted pacifist because of his experiences during WWII. All of his writing and novels during the post-war years had to do with the war and making sure it never happened again. He encapsulated it in the phrase "never war again".

Media scandals 
The 1963 publication of The Clown was met with polemics in the press for its negative portrayal of the Catholic Church and the CDU party. Böll was devoted to Catholicism but also deeply critical of aspects of it (particularly in its most conservative incarnations). In particular, he was unable to forget the Concordat of July 1933 between the Vatican and the Nazis, signed by the future Pope Pius XII, which helped confer international legitimacy on the regime at an early stage in its development.

Böll's liberal views on religion and social issues inspired the wrath of conservatives in Germany. When constitutional reforms were passed in 1968 that cracked down on freedom, Böll spoke out against them. His 1972 article Soviel Liebe auf einmal (So much love at once) which accused the tabloid Bild of falsified journalism, was in turn retitled, at the time of publishing and against Böll's wishes, by Der Spiegel, and the imposed title was used as a pretext to accuse Böll of sympathy with terrorism. This particular criticism was driven in large part by his repeated insistence upon the importance of due process and the correct and fair application of the law in the case of the Baader-Meinhof Gang. In his article for Der Spiegel entitled Sixty Million against Six he asked for a safeguard for Ulrike Meinhof in order to open a dialogue and prevent a major press campaign and police campaign. He received heavy criticism for this and was dubbed "the spiritual father of the violence" by one journalist in the Springer press.

The conservative press even attacked Böll's 1972 Nobel Prize, arguing that it was awarded only to "liberals and left-wing radicals".

On 7 February 1974, the BZ, Berlin's most widely-read newspaper at the time reported on Böll's home being searched. However, his home was only searched at 4 PM later that day, after the newspaper had already been circulated.

In 1977, after the abduction of Hanns Martin Schleyer, 40 police searched Böll's house based on an anonymous tip they received that named Böll's son as an accomplice to the kidnappers. These claims turned out to be unfounded. The Christian Democrats placed Böll on a blacklist after this incident.

Influences
Böll was deeply rooted in his hometown of Cologne, with its strong Roman Catholicism and its rather rough and drastic sense of humour. In the immediate post-war period, he was preoccupied with memories of the War and the effect it had—materially and psychologically—on the lives of ordinary people. He made them the heroes in his writing. His Catholicism was important to his work in ways that can be compared to writers such as Graham Greene and Georges Bernanos though, as noted earlier, his perspective was a critical and challenging one towards Catholicism rather than a merely passive one.

He was deeply affected by the Nazi takeover of Cologne, as they essentially exiled him in his own town. Additionally, the destruction of Cologne as a result of the Allied bombing during World War II scarred him for life; he described the aftermath of the bombing in The Silent Angel. Architecturally, the newly-rebuilt Cologne, prosperous once more, left him indifferent. (Böll seems to have been an admirer of William Morris – he let it be known that he would have preferred Cologne Cathedral to have been left unfinished, with the 14th-century wooden crane at the top, as it had stood in 1848). Throughout his life, he remained in close contact with the citizens of Cologne, rich and poor. When he was in hospital, the nurses often complained about the "low-life" people who came to see their friend Heinrich Böll.

Böll had a great fondness for Ireland, holidaying with his wife at their second home there, on the west coast. Given this connection, it is tempting to see resonances between Böll's work – specifically, his surreal play A Mouthful of Earth – and that of his esoteric contemporary Samuel Beckett. Böll's concern about damage to the environment, so evident from his play, was a driving force behind the establishment of the Heinrich Böll Foundation.

Böll's villains are the figures of authority in government, business, the mainstream media, and in the Church, whom he castigates, sometimes humorously, sometimes acidly, for what he perceived as their conformism, lack of courage, self-satisfied attitude and abuse of power.

The newspapers in his books have no qualms with lying about the characters or destroying their lives, much like what Böll himself experienced when he was accused of harboring and defending anarchists.

Analysis
His works have been dubbed Trümmerliteratur (the literature of the rubble). He was a leader of the German writers who tried to come to grips with the memory of World War II, the Nazis, and the Holocaust and the guilt that came with them. Because of his refusal to avoid writing about the complexities and problems of the past he was labelled by some with the role of 'Gewissen der Nation' (conscience of the nation), in other words a catalyst and conduit for memorialisation and discussion in opposition to the tendency towards silence and taboo. This was a label that he himself was keen to jettison because he felt that it occluded a fair audit of those institutions which were truly responsible for what had happened.

He lived with his wife in Cologne and in the Eifel region. However, he also spent time on Achill Island off the west coast of Ireland. His cottage there is now used as a guesthouse for international and Irish artists. He recorded some of his experiences in Ireland in his book Irish Journal; later on, the people of Achill curated a festival in his honour. The Irish connection also influenced the translations into German by his wife Annemarie, which included works by Brendan Behan, J. M. Synge, G. B. Shaw, Flann O'Brien and Tomás Ó Criomhthain.

He was the president of the then West German P.E.N. and subsequently of the International P.E.N. organizations. He travelled frequently as a representative of the new, democratic Germany. His appearance and attitude were in complete contrast to the boastful, aggressive type of German which had become infamous all over the world during Adolf Hitler's rule. Böll was particularly successful in Eastern Europe, as he seemed to portray the dark side of capitalism in his books; his books were sold by the millions in the Soviet Union alone.

When Aleksandr Solzhenitsyn was expelled from the Soviet Union, he first took refuge in Böll's Eifel cottage. This was in part the result of Böll's visit to the Soviet Union in 1962 with a cultural delegation, the first of several trips he made to the country, during which he built friendships with several writers and connections with many producers of dissident literature. With Solzhenitsyn's meeting, Böll responded to the criticism from both sides that branded him an instrument of anti-socialist propaganda and on the other as a stooge for the East Germans with the following statement "perhaps many Germans do not read The Gulag Archipelago to experience the suffering of those to whom this monument is dedicated, but rather to forget the horror of their own history." Böll had previously recommended Solzhenitsyn for the Nobel Prize for Literature, under the auspices of his position in the West German P.E.N. When Solzhenitsyn was awarded the prize in 1976, he quoted from Böll's works to the reception committee.

In 1976, Böll publicly left the Catholic Church, "without falling away from the faith".

He died in 1985 at the age of 67.

Legacy and influence
Böll's memory lives on, among other places, at the Heinrich Böll Foundation. A special Heinrich Böll Archive was set up in the Cologne Library to house his personal papers, bought from his family, but much of the material was damaged, possibly irreparably, when the building collapsed in March 2009.

His cottage in Ireland has been used as a residency for writers since 1992.

Eric Anderson composed a set of musical compositions based upon the books of Böll: Silent Angel: Fire and Ashes of Heinrich Böll (2017) Meyer Records.

Selected bibliography 

 (1949) Der Zug war pünktlich (The Train Was on Time) – novel
 (1950) Wanderer, kommst du nach Spa… – short story
 (1951) Die schwarzen Schafe (Black Sheep) – short story
 (1951) Nicht nur zur Weihnachtszeit (Christmas Not Just Once a Year) – short story
 (1951) Wo warst du, Adam? (And where were you, Adam?) – novel
 (1952) Die Waage der Baleks (The Balek Scales) – short story
 (1953) Und sagte kein einziges Wort (And Never Said a Word) – novel
 (1954) Haus ohne Hüter (The Unguarded House; Tomorrow and Yesterday) – novel
 (1955) Das Brot der frühen Jahre (The Bread of Those Early Years) – novel
 (1957) Irisches Tagebuch (Irish Journal) – travel writing
 (1957) Die Spurlosen (Missing Persons) – essays
 (1958) Doktor Murkes gesammeltes Schweigen (Murke's Collected Silences, 1963) – short story
 (1959) Billard um halb zehn (Billiards at Half-past Nine) – novel
 (1962) Ein Schluck Erde (A Mouthful of Earth) – play
 (1963) Ansichten eines Clowns (The Clown) – novel
 (1963) Anekdote zur Senkung der Arbeitsmoral (Anecdote Concerning the Lowering of Productivity) – short story
 (1964) Entfernung von der Truppe (Absent Without Leave) – two novellas
 (1966) Ende einer Dienstfahrt (End of a Mission) – novel
 (1971) Gruppenbild mit Dame (Group Portrait with Lady) – novel
 (1974) Die verlorene Ehre der Katharina Blum (The Lost Honour of Katharina Blum) – novel
 (1979) Du fährst zu oft nach Heidelberg und andere Erzählungen (You Go to Heidelberg Too Often) – short stories
 (1979) Fürsorgliche Belagerung (The Safety Net) – novel
 (1981) Was soll aus dem Jungen bloß werden? Oder: Irgendwas mit Büchern (What's to Become of the Boy?) – autobiography of Böll's school years 1933–1937
 (1982) Vermintes Gelände
 (1982, written 1948) Das Vermächtnis (A Soldier's Legacy) – novel
 (1983) Die Verwundung und andere frühe Erzählungen (The Casualty) – unpublished stories from 1947–1952

Posthumous 
 (1985) Frauen vor Flusslandschaft (Women in a River Landscape)
 (1986) The Stories of Heinrich Böll – U.S. release
 (1992, written 1949/50) Der Engel schwieg (The Silent Angel) – novel
 (1995) Der blasse Hund – unpublished stories from 1937 & 1946–1952
 (2002, written 1946–1947) Kreuz ohne Liebe
 (2004, written 1938) Am Rande der Kirche
 (2011) The Collected Stories  – reissues of translations, U.S. release

Translations 
More than seventy translations of Annemarie and Heinrich Böll are listed in the bibliography published in 1995 by Werner Bellmann: works of Brendan Behan, Eilis Dillon, O. Henry, Paul Horgan, Bernard Malamud, J. D. Salinger, George Bernard Shaw et al.

 Das harte Leben (The Hard Life, Brian O'Nolan), translated by Heinrich Böll, Hamburg, Nannen, 1966, 79. Illustrations by Patrick Swift.

Reviews
Murdoch, Brian, (1982), Sisyphean Labours, which includes a review of The Safety Net, in Cencrastus No. 9, Summer 1982, p. 46,

See also 
 German literature
 List of German-language authors

References

Further reading

 
 
 Hanno Beth (Ed.): Heinrich Böll. Eine Einführung in das Gesamtwerk in Einzelinterpretationen. 2., überarbeitete und erweiterte Auflage. Königstein i.Ts. 1980.
 Alfred Böll: Bilder einer deutschen Familie. Die Bölls. Gustav Lübbe, Bergisch Gladbach 1981.
 Viktor Böll, Markus Schäfer and Jochen Schubert: Heinrich Böll. dtv, Munich, 2002 (dtv portrait).
 Lucia Borghese: Invito alla lettura di Heinrich Böll. Mursia, Milan 1980.
 Michael Butler (Ed.): The Narrative Fiction of Heinrich Böll. Social conscience and literary achievement. Cambridge 1994.
 
 Frank Finlay: On the Rationality of Poetry: Heinrich Böll's Aesthetic Thinking. Rodopi, Amsterdam/Atlanta 1996.
 Erhard Friedrichsmeyer: Die satirische Kurzprosa Heinrich Bölls. Chapel Hill 1981.
 Lawrence F. Glatz: Heinrich Böll als Moralist. Peter Lang, New York 1999.
 Christine Hummel: Intertextualität im Werk Heinrich Bölls. Wissenschaftlicher Verlag, Trier 2002.
 Manfred Jurgensen (Ed.): Böll. Untersuchungen zum Werk. Francke, Bern/Munich 1975.
 Christian Linder: Heinrich Böll. Leben & Schreiben 1917–1985. Kiepenheuer & Witsch, Cologne 1986.
 
 James H. Reid: Heinrich Böll. A German for His Time. Berg Publishers, Oxford/New York/Hamburg 1988. – German: Heinrich Böll. Ein Zeuge seiner Zeit. dtv, Munich 1991.
 Klaus Schröter: Heinrich Böll. Rowohlt, Reinbek 1987 (Rowohlts Monographien).
 Jochen Vogt: Heinrich Böll. 2. Auflage. Beck, Munich 1987.
 Heinrich Vormweg: Der andere Deutsche. Heinrich Böll. Eine Biographie. Kiepenheuer & Witsch, Cologne 2002.

External links 

 Heinrich Böll official website
 The Heinrich Böll Page.
 
 
 
 
 Lost Honor of Heinrich Böll documentary with Volker Schlöndorff and Margarethe von Trotta

 
1917 births
1985 deaths
20th-century German novelists
20th-century German short story writers
Georg Büchner Prize winners
German male novelists
German male short story writers
German Nobel laureates
German prisoners of war in World War II held by the United States
German Roman Catholics
German short story writers
PEN International
Nobel laureates in Literature
Members of the German Academy for Language and Literature
Writers from Cologne
People from the Rhine Province
Roman Catholic writers
Trümmerliteratur
University of Cologne alumni
Writers from North Rhine-Westphalia
Writers from Bydgoszcz
German Army personnel of World War II
Critics of work and the work ethic
Members of the American Philosophical Society